Microplax albofasciata is an insect--a species of True bug in the genus Microplax, a member of family Oxycarenidae. It is native from the Mediterranean north to the Channel Islands and Germany. It was first documented in the United States (in California) in 2012.

References

Hemiptera of Europe
Hemiptera of North America